K. K. University (KKU) is a private university located in Beraunti, near Bihar Sharif in Nalanda district, Bihar, India. The university was established in 2017 by Samajik Kalyan Sanstha under the Bihar Private Universities Act, 2013, one of the two first private universities in Bihar, the other being Sandip University, Sijoul. Both universities were approved by the Bihar Government in May 2017 following the passing of Private Universities (Amendment) Bill, 2017 in March 2017 which relaxed the rules for establishment of private universities in Bihar.

References

External links
 

Education in Nalanda district
Universities in Bihar
Educational institutions established in 2017
2017 establishments in Bihar
Private universities in India